Harry Zohn (November 21, 1923, Vienna – June 3, 2001, Boston) was an Austrian American literary historian, essayist and translator from German into English. Zohn was born in Austria and came to the United States with a stay in London en route.

Awards 

 1960: Federal Cross of Merit 1st Class
 1999: Ring of Honor of the City of Vienna

References 

1923 births
2001 deaths
Austrian emigrants to the United States
American historians
20th-century American translators
20th-century American writers
Suffolk University alumni
Clark University alumni
Harvard University alumni